Wan'an is a town under the administration of Wuping County, Fujian, China. , it has 6 villages under its administration.

References 

Township-level divisions of Fujian
Wuping County